The 2008 Hastings Borough Council election took place on 1 May 2008 to elect members of Hastings Borough Council in East Sussex, England. Half of the council was up for election and the council stayed under no overall control.

After the election, the composition of the council was:
Conservative 15
Labour 13
Liberal Democrat 3
Independent 1

Election result
Overall turnout in the election was 36.5%.

Ward results

References

2008 English local elections
2008
2000s in East Sussex